Long Qingquan (born December 3, 1990 in Longshan, Xiangxi, Hunan) is a Chinese weightlifter. He is a two-time Olympic champion in the 56 kg weight division.

Career
Long qualified for the 56 kg class at the 2008 Summer Olympics in Beijing, where he won a gold medal in the 56 kg weightlifting. He achieved two junior world records on his way to winning the gold in the men's weightlifting 56 kg category. The following year, he won the gold medal in the 56 kg category at the 2009 World Weightlifting Championships, with 292 kg in total.

Long failed to defend his title in 2010, losing out to compatriot Wu Jingbiao, and did not qualify for the 2011 Championships. He again lost out to Wu during the national trials for the 2012 Summer Olympics in London. Long took silver at the next World Championship meet in 2013, behind 2012 Olympic champion Om Yun-chol, and a bronze medal in 2014. He failed to register a lift at the 2015 World Weightlifting Championships.

At the 2016 Summer Olympics in Rio de Janeiro, Long won a gold medal in the 56kg category with a new world record of 307 kg, surpassing Halil Mutlu's world record of 305 kg set at Sydney Olympics 16 years ago.

References

External links
 
 

1990 births
Living people
People from Xiangxi
Weightlifters from Hunan
Chinese male weightlifters

Olympic weightlifters of China
Weightlifters at the 2016 Summer Olympics
2016 Olympic gold medalists for China
Medalists at the 2008 Summer Olympics
Weightlifters at the 2008 Summer Olympics
Olympic medalists in weightlifting

World Weightlifting Championships medalists
21st-century Chinese people